François Bujon de l'Estang (born August 21, 1940) is a French diplomat who served as the Ambassador of the French Republic to the United States from 1995 until 2002.

Early life and education
Bujon de l'Estang graduated from Sciences Po, ENA, and the Harvard School of Business Administration.

Career
Bujon de l'Estang was special assistant to President Charles de Gaulle from 1967 to 1969. He later served as diplomatic advisor to Prime Minister Jacques Chirac from 1986 to 1988.

Bujon de l'Estang was president and CEO of the US subsidiary of Cogema from 1982 to 1986, president and CEO of SFIM, from 1992 to 1993, and chairman of Citigroup, France.

Other activities
 Trilateral Commission, Member of the European Group

References

External links
François Bujon de l'Estang : « Le risque, pour B. Obama, c'est la “carterisation” », Le Grand Journal, 12/10/2009
http://www.washingtonlife.com/directories/photos/?letter=F&name=Francois-Bujon-de-l'Estang

1940 births
Living people
People from Neuilly-sur-Seine
Sciences Po alumni
École nationale d'administration alumni
Harvard Business School alumni
Ambassadors of France to the United States
Ambassadors of France to Canada
Officiers of the Légion d'honneur